The Model Technical Higher Secondary School (MTHSS) is a school among a group of Model Technical Higher Secondary Schools located in Kaprassery, Kerala, India. The schools are managed by the Institute of Human Resources Development (IHRD). Instruction is conducted in English.

The institution
MTHSS was established in Kerala, under the aegis of the Institute of Human Resources Development, Thiruvananthapuram. it provides technical education especially in Electronics, Computer Science and related areas. IHRD runs more than forty institutions.

The school is a coeducational institution preparing students of Secondary (VIII to X) and Higher secondary (XI & XII) levels.

External links
IHRD official site

References

Technical schools
Institute of Human Resources Development
High schools and secondary schools in Kerala
Schools in Ernakulam district
Educational institutions established in 1997
1997 establishments in Kerala
School website : http://thsskaprassery.ihrd.ac.in